The following is an incomplete list of monasteries in the United States.

Alabama

Christian 

 St. Bernard Abbey, a Benedictine monastery and preparatory school located in Cullman. Originally founded by monks from Saint Vincent Archabbey in 1891 to serve the predominantly German community of Cullman. Home to Ave Maria Grotto.

Arizona

Christian 

 Our Lady of Solitude Monastery, a Franciscan monastery located in Tonopah.
Santa Rita Abbey, a Roman Catholic monastery located in Sonoita.
St. Anthony's Greek Orthodox Monastery, a Greek Orthodox monastery located in Florence.
St. Paisius Orthodox Monastery, an Eastern Orthodox monastery located in Safford.

Arkansas

Buddhist 

 Gyobutsuji Zen Monastery, a Sōtō Zen monastery located in Kingston.

Christian 

 Marylake Carmelite Monastery, a Roman Catholic monastery located in Little Rock.
Subiaco Abbey, a Benedictine monastery located in Subiaco.

Alaska

Christian 

 St. Archangel Michael Skete, an Eastern Orthodox monastery located in Spruce Island.
 St. Nilus Island Skete, an Eastern Orthodox monastery located in Nelson Island.

California

Buddhist 

 Abhayagiri Buddhist Monastery, a Thai Forest Tradition monastery located in Redwood Valley.
 Berkeley Buddhist Monastery, a Chan Buddhist monastery located in Berkeley.
 City of Ten Thousand Buddhas, a Chan Buddhist monastery located in Talmage.
 Deer Park Monastery, an Order of Interbeing monastery located in Escondido.
 Dhammadharini Vihara, a Theravāda monastery located in Santa Rosa.
 Mettā Forest Monastery, a Theravāda monastery located in Valley Center.
 Shasta Abbey, a Sōtō Zen monastery located in Mount Shasta.
 Tassajara Zen Mountain Center, a Sōtō Zen monastery located in Carmel Valley, San Diego.

Christian 

 Abbey of New Clairvaux, a Roman Catholic monastery located in Vina.
Holy Cross Orthodox Monastery, an Eastern Orthodox monastery located in Castro Valley.
New Camaldoli Hermitage, a Benedictine monastery located in Big Sur.
Our Lady of the Redwoods Abbey, a Roman Catholic monastery located in Whitethorn.
Saint Herman of Alaska Monastery, an Eastern Orthodox monastery located in Platina.
St. Andrew's Abbey, a Benedictine monastery located in Valyermo.
St. Michael's Abbey, a Roman Catholic monastery located in Silverado.
St. Xenia Serbian Orthodox Skete, an Eastern Orthodox monastery located in Wildwood.

Colorado

Christian 

 St. Benedict's Monastery, a Roman Catholic monastery located in Snowmass.

Buddhist 

Great Dharma Chan, a Chan location located in Boulder, Colorado

Connecticut

Christian 

 Abbey of Regina Laudis, a Benedictine monastery located in Bethlehem.

Florida

Buddhist 

 Wat Florida Dhammaram, a Theravāda monastery located in Kissimmee.

Christian 

 Holy Name Monastery, a Benedictine monastery located in St. Leo.
 Saint Leo Abbey, a Benedictine monastery located in St. Leo.

Georgia

Christian 

 Monastery of the Holy Spirit, a Roman Catholic monastery located in Conyers, Georgia.
Savannah Priory, a Benedictine monastery located in Savannah.

Idaho

Christian 

 St. Gertrude's Convent and Chapel, a Benedictine monastery located in Cottonwood.

Illinois

Christian 

 Marmion Abbey, a Benedictine monastery located in Aurora.
New Gračanica Monastery, an Eastern Orthodox monastery located in Third Lake.
Passionist Fathers Monastery, a historic Roman Catholic monastery located in Chicago.
 Saint Sava Serbian Orthodox Monastery and Seminary, an Eastern Orthodox monastery located in Libertyville.

Indiana

Christian 

 Monastery Immaculate Conception, a Benedictine monastery located in Ferdinand.
 St. Meinrad Archabbey, a Benedictine monastery located in Saint Meinrad.

Iowa

Christian 

 New Melleray Abbey, a Roman Catholic monastery located in Dubuque.
Our Lady of the Mississippi Abbey, a Roman Catholic monastery located in Dubuque.
Regina Coeli Monastery, a historic Roman Catholic monastery located in Bettendorf.

Kansas

Christian 

 St. Benedict's Abbey, a Benedictine monastery located in Atchison.

Kentucky

Christian 

 Abbey of Our Lady of Gethsemani, a Roman Catholic monastery located in Bardstown, Kentucky.
St. Anne Convent, a Roman Catholic monastery located in Melbourne.
St. Rose Priory, a Roman Catholic monastery located in Springfield.

Louisiana

Christian 

 Dominican Sisters of the Heart of Jesus, a Roman Catholic monastery located in Lockport.
 Monastery of Mary, Mother of Grace, a Roman Catholic monastery located in Lafayette.
St. Joseph Abbey, a Benedictine monastery located in Saint Benedict.
Discalced Carmelite Nuns, a Roman Catholic monastery located in Covington, Louisiana.

Maryland 

 Mount Carmel Monastery, a Roman Catholic monastery located in Port Tobacco Village.
 Shrine of St. Anthony, a Roman Catholic monastery located in Ellicott City.

Massachusetts

Christian 

 Community of Jesus, a Benedictine monastery located in Orleans.
Mount Saint Mary's Abbey, a Roman Catholic monastery in Wrentham.
Society of St. John the Evangelist, an Anglican monastery in Cambridge.
St. Benedict Abbey, a Benedictine monastery located in Harvard.
St. Joseph's Abbey, a Roman Catholic monastery located in Spencer.

Michigan

Christian 

 St. Gregory's Abbey, an Anglican monastery in Three Rivers.
 St. Sabbas Russian Orthodox Monastery, an Eastern Orthodox monastery in Harper Woods.

Minnesota

Buddhist 

 Minnesota Buddhist Vihara, a Theravāda monastery located in Minneapolis.

Christian 

 Saint Benedict's Monastery, a Benedictine monastery located in St. Joseph.
Saint Brigid of Kildare Monastery, a Methodist monastery located in St. Joseph.
Saint John's Abbey, Collegeville, a Benedictine monastery located in Collegeville Township.

Mississippi

Buddhist 

 Magnolia Grove Monastery, a Plum Village Tradition monastery located in Batesville.

Missouri

Christian 

 Assumption Abbey, a Roman Catholic monastery located in Ava.
Benedictines of Mary, Queen of Apostles, a Benedictine monastery located in Gower.
Benedictine Sisters of Perpetual Adoration, a Benedictine monastery located in Clyde.
Conception Abbey, a Benedictine monastery located in Conception.
Saint Louis Abbey, a Benedictine monastery located in Creve Coeur.
St. Pachomious Monastery, an Eastern Orthodox monastery located in Greenfield.

Nebraska

Christian 

 Christ the King Priory, a Benedictine monastery located in Schuyler.
 Mount Michael Benedictine Abbey and High School, a Benedictine monastery in Omaha.

New Hampshire

Christian 

 Saint Anselm Abbey, a Benedictine monastery located in Goffstown.

New Jersey

Buddhist 

 Empty Cloud Monastery, a non-sectarian Buddhist monastery located in West Orange.

Christian 

 The Monastery and Church of Saint Michael the Archangel, a Roman Catholic monastery in Union City that closed in 1980.
Monastery of the Dominican Sisters of the Perpetual Rosary, a Roman Catholic monastery located in Union City.
Newark Abbey, a Benedictine monastery located in Newark.
Newton Abbey, a Benedictine monastery located in Newton.
St. Paul's Abbey, a Benedictine monastery located in Newton.

New Mexico

Christian 

 Monastery of Christ in the Desert, a Benedictine monastery located in Abiquiú.

New York

Buddhist 

 Blue Cliff Monastery, an Order of Interbeing monastery located in Pine Bush.
 Chuang Yen Monastery, a non-sectarian Buddhist monastery located in Kent.
 Dai Bosatsu Zendo Kongo-ji, a Rinzai monastery located in Livingston Manor.
 Karma Triyana Dharmachakra, a Tibetan Buddhist monastery located in Woodstock.
 New York Mahayana Temple, a non-sectarian Buddhist monastery located in South Cairo.
 Zen Mountain Monastery, a Mountains and Rivers Order monastery located in Mount Tremper.

Christian 

 Abbey of the Genesee, a Roman Catholic monastery located in York.
Corpus Christi Monastery, a Roman Catholic monastery located in New York City.
Genesee Abbey, a Trappist monastery located in Piffard.
 Holy Ascension Monastery, a Greek Old Calenderist monastery located in Bearsville.
Holy Cross Monastery, an Anglican monastery located in West Park.
Holy Trinity Monastery, an Eastern Orthodox monastery located in Jordanville.
Mount Saviour Monastery, a Benedictine monastery located in Pine City.
 New Skete, an Eastern Orthodox monastery located in Cambridge.
Novo-Diveevo Convent, an Eastern Orthodox monastery located in Nanuet.

North Carolina

Buddhist 

 Wat Carolina Buddhajakra Vanaram, a Thai Buddhist monastery located in Bolivia.

Christian 

 Belmont Abbey, a Benedictine monastery located in Belmont.

North Dakota

Christian 

 Assumption Abbey, a Benedictine monastery located in Richardton.

Ohio

Christian 

 Holy Cross Monastery and Church, a Roman Catholic monastery located in Cincinnati that closed in 1977.
St. Andrew Abbey, a Benedictine monastery located in Cleveland.
St. Mark Serbian Orthodox Monastery, an Eastern Orthodox monastery located in Sheffield.
St. Paul's Episcopal Church, a Roman Catholic monastery located in Cleveland.

Oklahoma

Christian 

 Clear Creek Abbey, a Benedictine monastery located in Hulbert.
 St. Gregory's Abbey, a Benedictine monastery located in Shawnee.

Oregon

Christian 

 Monastery of Our Lady of Jordan, a Roman Catholic monastery located in Jordan that closed in 1910.
 Monastery of the Precious Blood, a Roman Catholic monastery located in Montavilla, Portland.
Mount Angel Abbey, a Benedictine monastery located in Saint Benedict.
 Our Lady of Guadalupe Trappist Abbey, a Roman Catholic monastery located in Lafayette.

Pennsylvania

Christian 

 Benedictine Sisters of Elk County, a Benedictine monastery located in St. Marys that closed in 2014.
Daylesford Abbey, a Roman Catholic monastery located in Paoli.
Saint Emma Monastery, a Benedictine monastery located in Greensburg.
Saint Vincent Archabbey, a Benedictine monastery located in Latrobe.

Rhode Island

Christian 

 Portsmouth Abbey, a Benedictine monastery located in Narragansett Bay.

South Carolina

Christian 

 Mepkin Abbey, a Roman Catholic monastery located in Moncks Corner.

South Dakota

Christian 

 Blue Cloud Abbey, a Benedictine monastery located in Marvin that closed in 2012.

Tennessee

Christian 

 Orthodox Monastery of the Mother of God, Joy of All Who Sorrow, an Eastern Orthodox monastery located in Monteagle.

Texas

Buddhist 

 American Bodhi Center, a non-sectarian Buddhist monastery located in Houston.
 Jade Buddha Temple, a non-sectarian Buddhist monastery located in Houston.

Christian 

 Carmelite Monastery, a Roman Catholic monastery in Stanton.
Monastery of Our Lady of Charity, a Roman Catholic monastery in San Antonio which has since closed.
 Our Lady of Dallas Abbey, a Roman Catholic monastery located in Irving.

Utah

Christian 

 Abbey of Our Lady of the Holy Trinity, a Roman Catholic monastery located in Huntsville which closed in 2017.

 Carmel of the Immaculate Heart of Mary Monastery, in Holladay. The Carmelite nuns originally took residence downtown Salt Lake City, in December 1952 and then moved to Holladay, three years later. After their move to Holladay, it took another 20 years  before the physical monastery began to be built.

Vermont

Buddhist 

 Karmê Chöling, a Shambhala monastery located in Barnet.

Christian 

 Charterhouse of the Transfiguration, a Roman Catholic monastery located in Sandgate.
Weston Priory, a Benedictine monastery located in Weston.

Virginia

Christian 

 Holy Cross Abbey, a Roman Catholic monastery located in Berryville.
Our Lady of the Angels Monastery, a Roman Catholic monastery located in Crozet.

Washington

Buddhist 

 Sravasti Abbey, a Tibetan Buddhist monastery located in Newport.

Washington, D.C.

Christian 

 Franciscan Monastery of the Holy Land in America, a Roman Catholic monastery located in Washington, D.C.
Georgetown Visitation Monastery, a Roman Catholic monastery located in Washington, D.C.
Saint Anselm's Abbey (Washington, D.C.), a Benedctine monastery located in Washington, D.C.

West Virginia

Christian 

 Holy Cross Monastery, an Eastern Orthodox monastery located in Wayne.

Wisconsin

Buddhist 

 Deer Park Buddhist Center and Monastery, a Tibetan Buddhist monastery located in Oregon.

Christian 

 Benedictine Women of Madison, a Benedictine monastery located in Middleton.
Our Lady of Spring Bank Abbey, a Roman Catholic monastery located in Oconomowoc that closed in 2011.
Solus Christi Brothers, an Eastern Orthodox monastery in Milwaukee.
St. Mary of the Angels Church and Monastery, a Roman Catholic monastery in Green Bay.
St. Norbert Abbey, a Roman Catholic monastery located in De Pere.

References 

Lists of monasteries